Rodolphe Spillmann (25 October 1895 – 28 February 1981) was a Swiss fencer. He competed in the individual épée event at the 1948 Summer Olympics.

References

External links
 

1895 births
1981 deaths
Swiss male fencers
Olympic fencers of Switzerland
Fencers at the 1948 Summer Olympics
People from La Chaux-de-Fonds
Sportspeople from the canton of Neuchâtel